Ryszard Leon Piec (born Richard Leon Pietz; 17 August 1913 – 24 January 1979) was a Polish footballer.

Piec spent whole life in his native town of Lipiny, which now today is a district of Świętochłowice, in Upper Silesia. He played for Naprzód Lipiny, a team which, in spite of several attempts, never managed to qualify to the Polish Soccer League. In 1935-39 he represented Poland in 24 matches, scoring 5 goals. His debut took place in 1935 against Yugoslavia.

He participated in 1936 Olympic Games in Berlin, where Poland was placed on the 4th position, after losing 2:3 against Norway. During the Olympics, he played in three games - a qualifier versus Hungary (3:0), a quarterfinal versus Great Britain (5:4, he scored a goal) and a semifinal versus Austria (1:3). He also took part in a legendary 1938 World Cup Soccer match Poland - Brazil 5:6 (5 June 1938, Strasbourg, France).

During the Second World War German occupiers allowed Upper Silesians to participate in sports tournaments. Piec's club, Naprzód Lipiny, was forced to change its name to Turn und Sport (TUS) Lipine. Ryszard (then known as Richard Pietz), together with his brother Wilhelm Piec, was a key player in this team.

In the 1941-42 season of Germany Cup (DFB-Pokal), TUS Lipine with Piec brothers was a sensation. In round 3 the Silesians beat Adler Deblin 4:1, then in round 4, TUS Lipine beat Blau-Weiss 90 Berlin 4:1. In the semifinals however, professionals from TSV 1860 Munich proved to be too strong, beating TUS 6:0.

After the war Piec continued his career in Naprzód Lipiny, playing until 1951. Since then he was a coach.

References

See also
Polish Roster in World Cup Soccer France 1938

People from Świętochłowice
1913 births
1979 deaths
Polish footballers
Association football forwards
1938 FIFA World Cup players
Poland international footballers
Footballers at the 1936 Summer Olympics
Olympic footballers of Poland
People from the Province of Silesia
Sportspeople from Silesian Voivodeship